César Trouin (15 November 1866 - 31 July 1919) was a French politician.

Trouin was born in Oran, French Algeria.  He represented the Radical Party from 1902 to 1919 in the Chamber of Deputies.

References

1866 births
1919 deaths
People from Oran
People of French Algeria
Pieds-Noirs
Radical Party (France) politicians
Members of the 8th Chamber of Deputies of the French Third Republic
Members of the 9th Chamber of Deputies of the French Third Republic
Members of the 10th Chamber of Deputies of the French Third Republic
Members of the 11th Chamber of Deputies of the French Third Republic